Brandley may refer to:

Given name 
Brandley Kuwas (born 1992), Curaçaoan footballer

Surname 
April Brandley (born 1990), Australian netballer
Clarence Brandley (1951–2018), African-American who was wrongly convicted of a rape and murder
Theodore Brandley (1851–1928), Mormon missionary and colonizer of Stirling, Alberta, Canada